On 1 April 2006 Expeditionary Air Wings (EAWs) were formed at nine of the RAF's Main Operating Bases. Each EAW has its own identity and is led by the Station Commander, supported by his Station management team. The deployable elements of the station structures form the core of each EAW, reinforced by  elements of the Air Combat Service Support Units (ACSSUs). Flying and Force Protection force elements are attached to meet the requirements of each operation.  EAWs enable the RAF to train as cohesive air power units which are prepared and capable of transitioning quickly from peacetime structures and deploying swiftly on operations in tailored packages.

UK based wings

Current wings

No. 34 EAW 
 RAF Waddington  (ISTAR)
 Previously located at RAF Lyneham; deployed between May and December 2016 to NSA Souda Bay supporting Operation Shader.

No. 38 EAW 
  38 EAW is an Air Mobility specialist EAW composed of personnel from RAF Brize Norton and RAF Northolt.
 Deployed to Barbados on Operation Ruman 9 September 17 to  support Hurricane Irma relief efforts in the Caribbean. 38 EAW comprised
 Elements of No. XXIV Squadron.  (38 EAW was commanded by OC of No. 24 Squadron).
 Elements of No. 47 Squadron RAF with Lockheed Hercules C4/C5. 
 Elements of No. LXX Squadron RAF with Airbus Atlas C1.
 Elements of No. 99 Squadron RAF with Boeing C-17 Globemaster III.
 Elements of No 1 Air Mobility Wing

No. 121 EAW 
 No. 121 Expeditionary Air Wing at RAF Coningsby 
 Deployed to RAF Akrotiri from August to November 2013 for Operation Luminous comprised
 Elements of No. XI Squadron with Eurofighter Typhoon FGR4
 Elements of No. 8 Squadron with Boeing Sentry AEW1
 Elements of No. 216 Squadron with Lockheed Tristar
 Elements of No. 1 Air Control Centre with T101 Radar
 Elements of No. 4 Force Protection Wing
 Deployed to Ämari Air Base from April to September 2015 for Operation Azotize with Typhoon FGR4

No. 135 EAW 
 No. 135 Expeditionary Air Wing, RAF Leeming
 Deployed to Šiauliai, Lithuania from April to September 2014 for Operation Azotize with Typhoon FGR4
 Deployed to Mihail Kogalniceanu airbase near Constanța, Romania from April to August 2017 under Operation Biloxi with four Typhoon FGR4s of No. 3 (Fighter) Squadron.
Deployed to Mihail Kogalniceanu airbase near Constanta, Romania in April 2018 under Operation Biloxi with four Typhoon FGR4s of No.1 (Fighter) Squadron and  No. II (Army Cooperation) Squadron.
Deployed to Šiauliai, Lithuania from April to September 2019 for Operation Azotize with Typhoon FGR4 of No. 6 Squadron.

No. 138 EAW 

 RAF Marham 
 Believed to have deployed to West Africa in 2014 for Operation Turus with Panavia Tornado GR4

No. 140 EAW 
 RAF Lossiemouth 
 Deployed to RAF Akrotiri from August to December 2014 for Operation Shader, succeeded by 903 EAW, comprised
 Elements of the RAF Tornado Force (Tornado GR4 strike aircraft)
 Elements of the RAF Air Mobility Force:
 Hercules C5 transport aircraft
 Voyager KC3 tanker aircraft
 Deployed to Ämari Air Base from April to September 2016 for Operation Azotize with Typhoon FGR4

Former wings 
 No. 122 EAW - RAF Cottesmore (Fighter / Ground Attack) -  stood down in 2012 
 No. 125 EAW - RAF Leuchars (Fighter) -  stood down in 2013 
 No. 325 EAW - RAF Kinloss (Maritime Patrol & Surveillance) - stood down in 2013

Deployed Wings

No. 83 Expeditionary Air Group

No. 901 Expeditionary Air Wing 
As of 2017, the wing was located at RAF Al Udeid, providing  support to Headquarters 83 EAG and Headquarters Joint Force Communication and Information Systems (Middle East).

Previously as a Middle Eastern EAW it comprised "A" Flight, at a not-publicly known location, flying Lockheed Hercules C4; "B" Flight (unknown location, reformed in 2013 as unknown) flying the Boeing C-17A Globemaster III; and "C" Flight (disbanded March 2015) at Bahrain International Airport flying a mix of BAe125s and BAe146s from No. 32 (The Royal) Squadron.

During the Second World War, No. 901 Wing formed part of No. 224 Group RAF, Third Tactical Air Force. It was formed on 1 October 1944 at Chiringa in British India. At the time of its formation, 901 Wing consisted of two Squadrons: 177 and 211 Squadron, both of which flew Bristol Beaufighter twin-engined fighter-bombers. The Wing was renamed No 901 (Tactical) Wing with effect from 1 December 1944. The Wing continued to operate up to four squadrons equipped with Beaufighters and de Havilland Mosquitoes during 1944-45.

No. 902 EAW 
RAFO Musannah in support of Operation Kipion (May 2015 – present):
 2 x AgustaWestland Merlin HM.2 helicopters.
Previous:
 During 2008: Muscat International Airport, Oman.
 Hawker Siddeley Nimrod MR2 & R1 
 October 2013: Unknown deployed location suspected to be Muscat International Airport, Oman.
Sentinel R1 Airborne Stand Off Radar (ASTOR) aircraft from No. V (Army Cooperation) Squadron

No. 903 EAW 

 RAF Akrotiri in support of Operation Shader (14 December 2014 – present):
 Elements of the RAF Typhoon Force (9 x Typhoon FGR4 multirole fighter aircraft)
 Elements of the RAF Air Mobility Force:
 2 x Hercules C5 transport aircraft (1 withdrawn during 2014)
 2 x Voyager KC3 tanker aircraft
 Elements of the RAF ISTAR Force:
 2 x Sentinel R1 ISTAR aircraft from No. V(Army Cooperation) Squadron
 2 x Sentry AEW1 AEW&C aircraft from No. 8 Squadron (aircraft withdrawn from service 2021)
 Elements of the RAF A4 Force.
 Previous
 Elements of the RAF Tornado Force (10 x Tornado GR4 strike aircraft) (Retired 2019)
Contingency Operating Base Basra/Basra Airport, Iraq for Operation Telic (2003- 2009).
Camp Bastion, Afghanistan for Operation Herrick (2009-2014)

No. 906 EAW 
Al Minhad Air Base, United Arab Emirates (15 January 2013 – present):
Previous:
Gioia del Colle Air Base, Italy in support of Operation Ellamy (2011) comprising
 10 × Eurofighter Typhoon multirole fighters from RAF Coningsby and RAF Lossiemouth,
 16 × Tornado GR4 interdictor/strike aircraft from RAF Marham

British Forces South Atlantic Islands

No. 905 EAW 
RAF Mount Pleasant, Falklands Islands  (1 April 2006 – present)
 No. 1312 Flight RAF
  Airbus A400M Atlas
 Voyager KC2
 Previously VC10 and Tristar
 No. 1435 Flight RAF
 4 x Eurofighter Typhoon
 Previously Panavia Tornado F3s
Previous:Unknown

Disbanded Wings

No. 904 EAW 

Kandahar Airfield, Afghanistan for Operation Herrick (2006-2015).
Harrier aircraft (eight aircraft, with eleven crews) 2009

No. 907 EAW 
RAF Akrotiri in support of Operation Ellamy (2011) comprising
 3 × Sentry AEW1 AWACS aircraft from RAF Waddington
 1 x Nimrod R1 signals intelligence aircraft from No 51 Squadron – operational requirements forced the Royal Air Force to deploy one of its two remaining Nimrod R1s two weeks before they were due to be withdrawn. 
 1 x Sentinel R1 airborne standoff radar aircraft from No V(Army Cooperation) Squadron

See also 
RAF Advanced Air Striking Force

References

Citations

Bibliography

 https://www.heraldry-wiki.com/heraldrywiki/wiki/No_906_Expeditionary_Air_Wing,_Royal_Air_Force - 906 EAW badge

E 
Expeditionary units and formations